Jerome Palmer Cowan (October 6, 1897 – January 24, 1972) was an American stage, film, and television actor.

Early years 
Cowan was born in New York City, the son of William Cowan, a confectioner of Scottish descent, and Julia Cowan, née Palmer.

Stage 
At 18, Cowan joined a travelling stock company, shortly afterwards enlisting in the United States Navy during World War I. After the war he returned to the stage and became a vaudeville headliner, then gained success on the New York stage. His Broadway debut was in We've Got to Have Money (1923). His other Broadway credits include Frankie and Johnnie (1930), Just to Remind You (1931), Rendezvous (1932), The Little Black Book (1932), Marathon (1933), Both Your Houses (1933), As Thousands Cheer (1933), Ladies' Money (1934), Paths of Glory (1935), Boy Meets Girl (1935), My Three Angels (1953), Lunatics and Lovers (1954), Rumple (1957), and Say, Darling (1958).

Film 
He was spotted by Samuel Goldwyn and was given a film contract, his first film being Beloved Enemy.

He appeared in more than one hundred films, but is probably best remembered for two roles in classic films:  Miles Archer, the doomed private eye partner of Sam Spade in The Maltese Falcon and Thomas Mara, the hapless district attorney who has to prosecute Santa Claus in Miracle on 34th Street.

Cowan also played Dagwood Bumstead's boss Mr. Radcliffe in several installments of Columbia Pictures' Blondie series. He also appeared in Deadline at Dawn, June Bride, and High Sierra.

Television 
Cowan starred in Not for Publication on the DuMont Television Network in 1952. In 1959 he played Horatio Styles in the episode "Winter Song" of The Alaskans, with Roger Moore. That same year, he made two guest appearances in Perry Mason, starring Raymond Burr. He played murdered playwright Ernest Royce in "The Case of the Lost Last Act" and then Victor Latimore in "The Case of the Artful Dodger." He also appeared in The Twilight Zone episode "The Sixteen-Millimeter Shrine" and guest-starred on Richard Diamond, Private Detective.

In the 1960-1961 television season, Cowan starred as John Larsen, the owner of Comics, Inc., and the boss of Paul Morgan, a young cartoonist portrayed by Tab Hunter in The Tab Hunter Show. In 1962, he guest starred on Mr. Smith Goes to Washington. He also appeared on Daniel Boone and Going My Way, starring Gene Kelly.

In 1964 and 1965, Cowan appeared as the demanding Herbert Wilson in The Tycoon. Earlier in 1963, he appeared on The Real McCoys in its final season on CBS.

Death
On January 24, 1972, Cowan died at Encino Hospital Medical Center in Encino, California at age 74. He was survived by his wife and two daughters.

Recognition
Cowan has a star at 6251 Hollywood Boulevard in the Television section of the Hollywood Walk of Fame. It was dedicated on February 8, 1960.

Filmography

Beloved Enemy (1936) as Tim O'Rourke
You Only Live Once (1937) as Dr. Hill
Shall We Dance (1937) as Arthur Miller
New Faces of 1937 (1937) as Robert Hunt
Walter Wanger's Vogues of 1938 (1937) as W. Brockton
The Hurricane (1937) as Captain Nagle
The Goldwyn Follies (1938) as Director
There's Always a Woman (1938) as Nick Shane
St. Louis Blues (1939) as Ivan DeBrett
The Saint Strikes Back (1939) as Cullis
East Side of Heaven (1939) as Claudius De Wolfe
Exile Express (1939) as Paul Brandt
The Gracie Allen Murder Case (1939) as Daniel Mirche
She Married a Cop (1939) as Bob Adams
The Old Maid (1939) as Joe Ralston
The Great Victor Herbert (1939) as Barney Harris
Wolf of New York (1940) as Cosgrave
Castle on the Hudson (1940) as Ed Crowley
Framed (1940) as Monty de Granville
Ma! He's Making Eyes at Me (1940) as Ted Carter
Torrid Zone (1940) as Bob Anderson
City for Conquest (1940) as 'Dutch'
 The Quarterback (1940) as Townley
Meet the Wildcat (1940) as Digby Vanderhood III
Melody Ranch (1940) as Tommy Summerville
Street of Memories (1940) as Mr. Gower
Victory (1940) as Martin Ricardo
High Sierra (1941) as Healy
The Round up (1941) as Wade McGee
The Great Lie (1941) as Jock Thompson
Affectionately Yours (1941) as Cullen
Singapore Woman (1941) as Jim North
Too Many Blondes (1941) as Ted Bronson
Out of the Fog (1941) as Assistant D.A.
Kisses for Breakfast (1941) as Lucius Lorimer
Rags to Riches (1941) as Marshall Abbott
Kiss the Boys Goodbye (1941) as Bert Fisher
One Foot in Heaven (1941) as Dr. Horrigan
The Maltese Falcon (1941) as Miles Archer
The Bugle Sounds (1942) as Mr. Nichols
A Gentleman at Heart (1942) as Finchley
Mr. and Mrs. North (1942) as Ben Wilson
Frisco Lil (1942) as Vince Warren
The Girl from Alaska (1942) as Ravenhill
Moontide (1942) as Dr. Frank Brothers
Thru Different Eyes (1942) as Jim Gardner
Joan of Ozark (1942) as Phillip Munson
Street of Chance (1942) as Bill Diedrich
Who Done It? (1942) as Marco Heller
No Place for a Lady (1943) as Eddie Moore
Ladies' Day (1943) as Updyke (banker)
Mission to Moscow (1943) as Spendler (uncredited)
Silver Spurs (1943) as Jerry Johnson
Hi'ya, Sailor (1943) as Lou Asher
Find the Blackmailer (1943) as D.L. Trees
The Crime Doctor's Strangest Case (1943) as Mallory Cartwright
The Song of Bernadette (1943) as Emperor Louis Napoleon III
Sing a Jingle (1944) as Andrews
Mr. Skeffington (1944) as Edward Morrison
South of Dixie (1944) as Bill 'Brains' Watson
Minstrel Man (1944) as Bill Evans
Crime by Night (1944) as Sam Campbell
Guest in the House (1944) as Mr. Hackett
Fog Island (1945) as Kavanaugh
The Crime Doctor's Courage (1945) as Jeffers 'Jeff' Jerome
G. I. Honeymoon (1945) as Ace Renaldo
Blonde Ransom (1945) as Ice Larson
The Jungle Captive (1945) as Detective W.L. Harrigan
Hitchhike to Happiness (1945) as Tony Riggs
Divorce (1945) as Jim Driscoll
Behind City Lights (1945) as Perry Borden
Getting Gertie's Garter (1945) as Billy
One Way to Love (1946) as A.J. Gunther
My Reputation (1946) as George Van Orman
Deadline at Dawn (1946) as Lester Brady
Claudia and David (1946) as Brian O'Toole
The Kid from Brooklyn (1946) as Fight Announcer
Murder in the Music Hall (1946) as George Morgan
Night in Paradise (1946) as Scribe
One Exciting Week (1946) as Al Carter
Deadline for Murder (1946) as Lynch
Mr. Ace (1946) as Peter Craig
Flight to Nowhere (1946) as Gerald Porter
Blondie Knows Best (1946) as Charles Peabody
Blondie's Big Moment (1947) as George M. Radcliffe (uncredited)
The Perfect Marriage (1947) as Addison Manning
The Unfaithful (1947) as Prosecuting Attorney
Blondie's Holiday (1947) as George M. Radcliffe
Miracle on 34th Street (1947) as Dist. Atty. Thomas Mara
Riffraff (1947) as Walter F. Gredson
Cry Wolf (1947) as Sen. Caldwell
Driftwood (1947) as Mayor Snyder
Blondie in the Dough (1947) as George Radcliffe
Dangerous Years (1947) as Weston
Blondie's Anniversary (1947) as George M. Radcliffe
Arthur Takes Over (1948) as George Bradford
So This Is New York (1948) as Francis Griffin
Blondie's Reward (1948) as George M. Radcliffe
Wallflower (1948) as Robert 'Bob' James
Night Has a Thousand Eyes (1948) as Whitney Courtland
June Bride (1948) as Carleton Towne
Blondie's Secret (1948) as George Radcliffe
Life of St. Paul Series (1949) as Demetrius
Blondie's Big Deal (1949) as George M. Radcliffe
The Fountainhead (1949) as Alvah Scarret
The Girl from Jones Beach (1949) as Mr. Graves - Ruth's Attorney
Scene of the Crime (1949) as Arthur Webson
Blondie Hits the Jackpot (1949) as George Radcliffe
Always Leave Them Laughing (1949) as Elliott Montgomery
Joe Palooka Meets Humphrey (1950) as Belden
Young Man with a Horn (1950) as Phil Morrison
Peggy (1950) as Fred Collins
When You're Smiling (1950) as Herbert Reynolds
The Fuller Brush Girl (1950) as Harvey Simpson
The West Point Story (1950) as Mr. Jocelyn
Dallas (1950) as Matt Coulter
The Fat Man (1951) as Police Lieutenant Stark
Criminal Lawyer (1951) as Walter Medford
Disk Jockey (1951) as Marley
Magnificent Adventure (1952)
The System (1953) as Barry X. Brady
Have Rocket, Will Travel (1959) as J.P. Morse
Visit to a Small Planet (1960) as George Abercrombie
Private Property (1960) as Ed Hogate
All in a Night's Work (1961) as Sam Weaver
Pocketful of Miracles (1961) as Mayor
Critic's Choice (1963) as Joe Rosenfield
Black Zoo (1963) as Jerry Stengel
The Patsy (1964) as Business Executive (uncredited)
John Goldfarb, Please Come Home! (1965) as Ambassadaor Brinkley
Frankie and Johnny (1966) as Joe Wilbur (uncredited)
Penelope (1966) as Bank Manager
The Gnome-Mobile (1967) as Dr. Ramsey
The Comic (1969) as Lawrence

References

External links

 

1897 births
1972 deaths
Male actors from New York City
American male film actors
American male television actors
American male stage actors
Male actors from Los Angeles
20th-century American male actors
United States Navy personnel of World War I
United States Navy sailors
American people of Scottish descent